Royal Air Force Dundonald or more simply RAF Dundonald is a former Royal Air Force station located in South Ayrshire, Scotland, three miles north-east from the coastal town of Troon.

During its brief existence during the Second World War the airfield was used for training purposes, most notably by 516 Squadron providing air support for commando and assault troop training.

History
The airfield opened in March 1940 as a relief landing ground (RLG) for nearby RAF Prestwick.  At that time Prestwick was occupied by No. 12 Elementary Flying Training School (12 EFTS) and the RLG was mainly used by novice pilots practising circuits and bumps in de Havilland Tiger Moth trainers.  For this purpose only the most basic airfield facilities were required, and RAF Dundonald had two short grass runways which were later reinforced with Sommerfeld Tracking.

Author John Harris has suggested there is evidence RAF Dundonald may have been the intended destination of Rudolf Hess who had to bail out on his flight to Britain on 10 May 1941. Harris also suggests Prince George may have been waiting there for Hess to negotiate as part of a plot involving his brother the king proroguing parliament and removing Churchill from power, which did not succeed, or that may simply have been an MI6 ruse to lure him out of Hitler's orbit to make way for Martin Bormann.

After 12 EFTS was disbanded in March 1941 Dundonald saw little use until April 1943 when 516 (Combined Operations) Squadron formed at the airfield.  The squadron operated a mixed collection of aircraft, mainly North American Mustang and Hawker Hurricane fighter-bombers as well as some Bristol Blenheim, Westland Lysander, Avro Anson and Percival Proctor aircraft.  The role of the squadron was to support commando and assault training exercises by providing realistic simulation air attacks and numerous other army support functions.  Detachments from a number of other RAF and Fleet Air Arm squadrons also operated from Dundonald for brief periods in support of combined operations training exercises.

Following the success of the Normandy landings the need for combined operations training diminished, and 516 Squadron was disbanded in December 1944.  Thereafter RAF Dundonald was placed on care and maintenance and saw only occasional use until the end of the war.  The airfield closed in August 1945 but the site was retained for use by the army until 1952.

Units

 No. 2 Squadron RAF
 Relief Landing Ground for No. 12 Elementary Flying Training School RAF (March 1940 -)
 No. 18 Squadron RAF
 No. 26 Squadron RAF
 No. 63 Squadron RAF
 No. 268 Squadron RAF
 No. 414 Squadron RCAF
 808 Naval Air Squadron
 879 Naval Air Squadron
 885 Naval Air Squadron
 886 Naval Air Squadron
 897 Naval Air Squadron
 No. 1441 (Combined Operations Development) Flight RAF (October 1942 – April 1943) became No. 516 Squadron RAF

Subsequent use
A Monsanto Nylon plant was built on part of the former airfield in the 1960s, but it closed in 1979 and was redeveloped as an industrial estate named Olympic Business Park. The balance of the site reverted to farmland.  None of the temporary wartime buildings survive and there is now little evidence of the former airfield, however the outlines of parts of the runways can still be discerned on satellite images.

References

Citations

Bibliography

External links
516 Squadron in World War II 
Olympic Business Park, Dundonald, Kilmarnock

Royal Air Force stations of World War II in the United Kingdom
Royal Air Force stations in Scotland
Royal Air Force stations in Ayrshire
Military airbases established in 1940
Defunct airports in Scotland